A by-election was held for the New South Wales Legislative Assembly electorate of Port Stephens on 5 November 1988 because the Court of Disputed Returns declared that the 1988 Port Stephens election was void because Bob Martin handed government cheques to community groups during the campaign and this amounted to electoral bribery.

Dates

Result

	

	

The 1988 Port Stephens election was declared void due to bribery.

See also
Electoral results for the district of Port Stephens
List of New South Wales state by-elections

Notes

References

1988 elections in Australia
New South Wales state by-elections
1980s in New South Wales